Karnitsky is a surname. Notable people with the surname include:

Alyaksandr Karnitsky (born 1989), Belarusian footballer
Valery Karnitsky (born 1991), Belarusian footballer

A Polish form of the name is Karnicki
Borys Karnicki

Belarusian-language surnames